Daniel Spencil Johnson (June 21, 1898 – death unknown), nicknamed "Shang", was an American Negro league pitcher between 1917 and 1925.

A native of Alabama, Johnson attended Morris Brown College. He made his Negro leagues debut in 1917 with the Bacharach Giants and the Hilldale Club. He went on to pitch for the Brooklyn Royal Giants and Pennsylvania Red Caps of New York, and finished his career in 1925 with the Lincoln Giants.

References

External links
 and Baseball-Reference Black Baseball stats and Seamheads

1898 births
Place of birth missing
Place of death missing
Year of death missing
Bacharach Giants players
Brooklyn Royal Giants players
Hilldale Club players
Lincoln Giants players
Pennsylvania Red Caps of New York players
Baseball pitchers
Baseball players from Alabama
Morris Brown College alumni